Renwick is a locality in the Wingecarribee Shire of New South Wales. It is situated on the outskirts of Mittagong.

It was the site of the former Mittagong Farm Home, a major facility for displaced and orphaned children and wards of the state. In conjunction with cottage homes in Mittagong itself, it saw more than 30,000 children accommodated throughout its lifetime.

In 2018, it is the focus of suburban redevelopment by government agency Landcom. The site is to contain "around 600" lots, with a planned village centre to include a community centre, village square and "small retail component".

Heritage listings
Renwick has a number of heritage-listed sites, including:
 82 Bong Bong Road: Challoner Cottage

References

Localities in New South Wales